Kankkunen is a Finnish surname. Notable people with the surname include:

 Juha Kankkunen (born 1959), Finnish rally driver
 Teemu Kankkunen (born 1980), Finnish footballer and coach

See also
 Kankkonen

Finnish-language surnames